Pseudonacaduba sichela, the African line blue, dusky line blue or dusky blue, is a butterfly of the family Lycaenidae. It is found in Africa, south of the Sahara.

The wingspan is 25–28 mm for males and 25–27 mm for females. Adults are on wing from October to May.

The larvae probably feed on Mundulea sericea.

Subspecies
Pseudonacaduba sichela sichela (Africa, south of the Sahara)
Pseudonacaduba sichela reticulum (Mabille, 1877) (Madagascar and Mauritius)

References

Butterflies described in 1857
Polyommatini